Bernard Bonvoisin, known as Bernie Bonvoisin (born 9 July 1956 in Nanterre, Hauts-de-Seine), is a French hard rock singer and film director. He is best known for having been the singer of Trust.

He was one of the best friends of Bon Scott the singer of AC/DC and together they recorded the song "Ride On" which was one of the last songs by Bon Scott.

External links 
 

1956 births
Living people
People from Nanterre
French rock singers
French male singers
French film directors
Trust (French band) members